Cornelis Hubertus Johannes (Cees) van Leeuwen (born 1951) is a Dutch former member of parliament for the Pim Fortuyn List (LPF) from 2002 to 2003.

Van Leeuwen was elected as a Member of the House of Representatives at the 2002 election and subsequently served as Secretary of State for Education, Culture and Science in the First Balkenende cabinet. He was also a founding member and former bassist of the Dutch progressive rock group Kayak. He has since worked as a lawyer specializing in employment law and entertainment law.

References 

Pim Fortuyn List politicians
Members of the House of Representatives (Netherlands)
21st-century Dutch politicians
Musicians from The Hague
Kayak (band) members
1951 births
Living people
Politicians from The Hague